Against the Current may refer to:

Film
 Against the Current (film), a 2009 film starring Joseph Fiennes, Elizabeth Reaser and Justin Kirk

Print media
 Against the Current: Essays in the History of Ideas, 1979 book
 Against the Current (journal), the journal of the American socialist group Solidarity
 Against the Current: How Albert Schweitzer Inspired a Young Man's Journey, 2014 book about Mark Huntington Higgins

Music
 Against the Current (band), a band signed by Fueled By Ramen
 Against the Current, also known as Contra La Corriente, a 1997 album by Marc Anthony
 Boats Against the Current, a 1977 album by Eric Carmen

See also
Countercurrent (disambiguation)